"Tú reinas" (Spanish) or "Tu reinas" (Portuguese), meaning "You reign", may refer to:

 Tu Reinas an album by Diante do Trono
"Tu reinas", the title track of the album by Diante do Trono
"Tú reinas", Spanish song by the Mexican Christian rock band Rojo from Apasionado Por Ti 2009
"Tú reinas", Spanish song and single by Seth Condrey from album North Point en Vivo 2012